F.U. Don't Take It Personal is the debut studio album from American hip hop group Fu-Schnickens, released February 25, 1992, on Jive Records. Recording sessions for the album took place at Battery Studios in New York, New York.

The album peaked at number sixty-four on the Billboard 200 chart. By late 1992, it was certified gold by the RIAA, for shipping 500,000 copies in the United States.

Background
The album was recorded at Battery Studios in New York, New York.

Release and reception

F.U. Don't Take It Personal peaked at sixty-four on the U.S. Billboard 200 and reached the thirteenth spot on the R&B Albums chart. The album was certified gold in 1992.

In The Village Voice, Robert Christgau praised Fu-Schnickens' ideas and illusory rhymes, calling the group "rappers whose visions of fun, agape, and aural conquest remain open-ended, playful, and, face it, silly". Stanton Swihart at Allmusic wrote in retrospect that "although their fashion sense (kung fu outfits on the cover) and taste in influences may have initially painted them as a novelty, their approach to music was straight serious on this debut album, and it shows."

Track listing

Chart history

Album

Singles

"—" denotes releases that did not chart.

Personnel
Information taken from Allmusic.
assistant engineering – Charlie Allen, Pete Christensen, Eric Gast, Gerard Julien, Tim Latham
engineering – Barbera Aimes, Anthony Saunders
mixing – Ali Shaheed Muhammad, Bob Power, Chris Trevett
production – A Tribe Called Quest, Fu-Schnickens, Lyvio G.
vocals (background) – Debbie Lewis Aimes, Kia Jeffries, Hirami Kuroimo, Sally Ries

Notes

External links 
 F.U. Don't Take It Personal at Discogs

1992 debut albums
Fu-Schnickens albums
Jive Records albums